Eleven Seven Label Group is the American parent company of a group of rock and alternative rock record labels founded in 2006 by Allen Kovac, CEO of 10th Street Entertainment. It is seen as a successor to Kovac's earlier label, Beyond Music, which existed between 1998 and 2002. The Eleven Seven Music label is the home of recording artists Papa Roach, and others.

Eleven Seven Label Group was named Billboard magazine's Rock Label of the Year in 2010.

In 2009, Eleven Seven Label Group created an alternative/indie sub-label called Five Seven Music for alternative rock bands such as Just Loud, Bleeker, Romes and Dirty Heads. The latter had three Top five Billboard alternative chart albums. Better Noise Records, another home for hard rock acts, was founded in 2015 as part of Eleven Seven.

Eleven Seven expanded its base from New York City and Los Angeles, with the opening of international offices in London, England in 2012, and Berlin, Germany in 2019. The company entered into a global partnership with Marshall Records in 2018 in order to bring Marshall artists to North and South America via Eleven Seven's distribution system.

In October 2019, Eleven Seven Label Group rebranded all the labels under the umbrella (Eleven Seven, Five Seven and Better Noise) to the new name of Better Noise Music, and all releases since have been released under the label Better Noise Music. Two months later, it signed a global marketing and distribution deal with FUGA, the Netherlands-based subsidiary of AVL Digital Group (itself a subsidiary of Downtown).

Rosters

Eleven Seven
 Mötley Crüe (as the distributor of Mötley Records)
 Sixx:A.M.

Better Noise Music
 All Good Things
 As Lions
 Atlas Genius
 Asking Alexandria
 Awolnation
 Bad Wolves
 Bleeker
 Classless Act
 Cory Marks
 Deuce
 Dirty Heads
 Escape the Fate
 Eva Under Fire
 Fire from the Gods
 Five Finger Death Punch
 From Ashes to New
 The Funeral Portrait
 Hellyeah
 The Hu
 Hyro the Hero
 In Flames (North America only)
 Islander
 Just Loud
 Mötley Crüe
 Nelly Furtado
 Nevrlands
 Nothing More
 Sixx:A.M.
 Tempt
 Tuk Smith and The Restless Hearts
 Vamps

Former artists
 Anavae
 Apocalyptica
 Art of Dying
 Attica Riots
 Bang Bang Romeo
 Buckcherry
 Charm City Devils
 Diamante
 The Exies
 Hellyeah
 Marion Raven 
 My Secret Circus
 Papa Roach
 Pop Evil
 Press to MECO (Marshall Records distribution)
 Rews (Marshall Records distribution)
 Romes
 Tommy Vext
 Trapt

See also
 List of record labels

References

External links

American record labels
Alternative rock record labels
Rock record labels